The Producers Guild of America Award for Best Long-Form Television, also known as the David L. Wolper Award for Outstanding Producer of Long-Form Television was an annual award given by the Producers Guild of America between 1994 and 2017. In 2018, the guild announced the creation of two new accolades to replace the award: the David L. Wolper Award for Outstanding Producer of Limited Series Television and the Award for Outstanding Producer of Streamed or Televised Movies.

Winners and nominees

1990s

2000s

2010s

Total awards by network
 HBO – 15
 FX – 3
 PBS – 2
 ABC – 1
 NBC – 1
 Netflix – 1
 Showtime – 1

Programs with multiple nominations

4 nominations
 American Horror Story
 Sherlock

3 nominations
 Fargo

2 nominations
 Black Mirror

Programs with multiple awards
2 awards
 Fargo (consecutive)

References

Long-Form TV